The 1980 Drake Bulldogs football team was an American football team that represented Drake University during the 1980 NCAA Division I-A football season as a member of the Missouri Valley Conference (MVC). In its sixth year under head coach Chuck Shelton, the team compiled a 8–3 record.

Schedule

References

Drake
Drake Bulldogs football seasons
Drake Bulldogs football